The Thiambutenes are a family of opioid analgesic drugs developed at the British research laboratory of Burroughs-Wellcome in the late 1940s. The parent compound thiambutene has no analgesic effects, but several compounds from this group are analgesics with around the same potency as morphine.

Notable compounds include dimethylthiambutene, diethylthiambutene, ethylmethylthiambutene, pyrrolidinylthiambutene and piperidylthiambutene. Of these, ethylmethylthiambutene is the most potent, with 1.3x the potency of morphine, pyrrolidinylthiambutene is the least potent at 0.7x, and the rest are all around the same potency as morphine. Diethylthiambutene has been the most widely used, mainly in veterinary medicine.

All of these compounds produced anticholinergic and antihistamine side effects, except for two of the weaker compounds diallylthiambutene and morpholinylthiambutene. They also all have a chiral centre on the alpha carbon (where the R1 group is attached) and so have two stereoisomers, with the dextro isomer being the more potent in all cases, although both isomers are active.

Three of these compounds are explicitly listed as illegal drugs under UN convention, diethylthiambutene, dimethylthiambutene and ethylmethylthiambutene, and so are illegal throughout the world, but the rest will only be illegal in countries such as the US, Australia and New Zealand that have laws equivalent to the Federal Analog Act.

References 

Opioids
Thiophenes
Amines
Mu-opioid receptor agonists